The Kenaston House is a historic building located in Rancho Mirage, California. The building is a fine example of the residences that master architect E. Stewart Williams designed between 1947 and the end of the 1960s. The single-story structure features a flat roof, deep overhangs, and large glass surface areas with sliding glass doors that facilitate its indoor-outdoor flow. He also integrated natural materials into the design that includes native rock used on some of the interior and exterior walls, and wood finishes that are used for the interior cabinets, doors, and walls. The house was listed on the National Register of Historic Places in 2016.

References

Houses completed in 1957
Rancho Mirage, California
National Register of Historic Places in Riverside County, California
Houses on the National Register of Historic Places in California
Modernist architecture in California
E. Stewart Williams buildings